Michelle Fierro (born January 6, 1967) is an American artist.

Life

Fierro went to college at California State University, Fullerton in 1992, and then the Claremont Graduate school in 1995. She is married and currently works and lives in Los Angeles with two children. Fierro was featured in the book 25 Women In Art by Dave Hickey.

Exhibitions
 2002 Michelle Fierro: Paintings, (solo), Brian Gross Fine Art, Los Angeles
 2011 Goldmine: Selections from the Michael and Sirje Gold Collection, California State University Long Beach
 2017 Michelle Fierro: New Paintings, (solo), c.nichols project, Los Angeles

Collections
Some of her works may be viewed at Kent State University OH, University of North Texas Denton TX, California State University Paintings from LA in San Bernardino, and The Sensation Line Denver Museum of Contemporary Art.

Her work is held in the collections of the 
Los Angeles Museum of Contemporary Art,
the Museum of Contemporary Art, North Miami, and 
the Orange County Museum of Art.

References

Further reading
 Interview by Gary Brewer, "Michelle Fierro: The Ethics of Ambiguity", Art and Cake, May 20, 2017
 David Pagel, "In Michelle Fierro's painting, mistakes lead only to possibility", Los Angeles Times, February 24, 2017

External links
C. Nichols Project

1967 births
Living people
21st-century American women artists
20th-century American women artists
California State University, Fullerton alumni
Claremont Graduate University alumni